The Gräshagen Church is a church building at Gräshagen in Jönköping, Sweden. Belonging to the Jönköping Sofia-Järstorp Parish of the Church of Sweden, it was opened on 1 December 1962.

References

20th-century Church of Sweden church buildings
Churches in Jönköping
Churches completed in 1962
Churches in the Diocese of Växjö